John Fox Jr. House, also known as the John Fox Jr. Museum, is a historic home located at Big Stone Gap, Wise County, Virginia. It is named for the American author John Fox Jr., who lived there from 1890 until 1919.

History
John Fox Jr. first visited the Cumberland Gap area while a student at Harvard College. His two older brothers, James and Horace, owned coal mines in Jellico, Tennessee, and the three came to the area as speculators and mineral developers in 1888. While exploring the area for business, John Fox became more and more fascinated with the region and its people, eventually abandoning his real estate interests for his writing. Works like The Trail of the Lonesome Pine and The Little Shepherd of Kingdom Come reflected both his interest as well as a general interest among American readers for the Appalachian people.

Despite his frequent travels, Fox had his productive writing period in the home on Shawnee Avenue and it is here that he wrote his most famous works. The original section of the Fox home was built in 1890, as a four-room cottage.  The house was subsequently expanded to a two-story, 20 room dwelling. The frame dwelling sits on a stone foundation.

Fritzi Scheff, a singer with the Metropolitan Opera, was fascinated by the region through reading Fox's stories. After divorcing her husband, she married Fox and came to live in the home with him; the two became local celebrities. However, she was disappointed to find Appalachian life less exciting than she anticipated and the two divorced in 1913.

House today
The house was opened as a museum in 1970 and is today operated by the Lonesome Pine Arts and Crafts Association. The building was listed on the National Register of Historic Places in 1974. The property remains furnished the way it was during the time of the Fox family's residence there.

References

External links

John Fox Jr. House Museum

Photo from National Register nomination

Historic house museums in Virginia
Museums in Wise County, Virginia
Houses on the National Register of Historic Places in Virginia
Houses completed in 1890
Houses in Wise County, Virginia
National Register of Historic Places in Wise County, Virginia
Literary museums in the United States
Biographical museums in Virginia